Morlaiter may refer to:

 Giovanni Maria Morlaiter (1699-1781), Italian sculptor 
 Michelangelo Morlaiter (1729-1806), Italian painter